The Reformed Church in Latvia is a confessional Calvinist denomination in Latvia with two congregations and the Baltic Reformed Seminary in Riga.

Origin 
This denomination currently has two congregations in Riga. The oldest Calvinist church was built in 1733, membership was mostly German traders and consisted of 1000 members till 1938. During World War II, the Germans left. In 1949, the Calvinist church joined the Evangelical Church of the Brethren and the Evangelical Brethren Community. The Evangelical - Reformed Brethren Community was formed. Later in 1964, during the Communist regime the church was transferred to a sound studio. 

In the 1990s the church was reorganised  and with the help of the Presbyterian Church in America planted another church and founded The Baltic Reformed Seminary. The church building was returned to the church in December 1993, the rededication service was held in May 1994. Since 1996, a pastor from Toronto serves the church.
The Reformed Church in Latvia is a member of the World Communion of Reformed Churches.

Theology 
The church teaches the five Solas:
 Sola scriptura - Scripture Alone
 Sola fide - Faith Alone
 Solus Christus - Christ Alone
 Sola gratia - Grace Alone
 Soli Deo gloria'' - the Glory of God Alone

Creeds 
 Apostles Creed
 Nicene Creed
 Athanasian Creed

Confessions 
 Heidelberg Catechism (1563)
 Westminster Confession of Faith (1647)
 Canons of Dort (1618)

Churches 
Baltic Reformed Seminary
Riga Reformed Church]
Riga Reformed Bible Church]
Mission to the World (PCA)

Interchurch relations 
It is a member of the World Communion of Reformed Churches.

References 

Reformed denominations in Europe
Members of the World Communion of Reformed Churches
Religion in Latvia
1733 establishments in the Russian Empire
Religious organizations established in 1733